Wang Chi may refer to:

 Seongjong of Goryeo (961–997), personal name Wang Chi
 Wang Chi (swimmer), Taiwanese swimmer
 Wang Chi (scientist), director of the National Space Science Center, Chinese Academy of Sciences
 Chi Wang, co-chair of the U.S.-China Policy Foundation

See also
Wang Ji (disambiguation)
Wang Qi (disambiguation)